Campeonato Tocantinense is the football league of the State of Tocantins, Brazil. It is organized by the Tocantins State Football Federation.

List of champions

Amateur era

Professional era

Names change
Intercap is the currently Paraíso EC.

Titles by team

Teams in bold stills active.

By city

External links
FTF Official Website

Campeonato Tocantinense
Tocantins